Maximiliano "Max" Alonso (born 10 October 1986) is a Chilean athlete specialising in the shot put and discus throw. He won a bronze medal in the shot put at the 2011 South American Championships.

International competitions

Personal bests
Outdoor
Shot put – 18.40 (Turlock 2011)
Discus throw – 60.85 (Hays 2014)
Hammer throw – 45.42 (Provo 2010)
Indoor
Shot put – 18.34 (Manhattan 2011)

References

1986 births
Living people
Chilean male shot putters
Chilean expatriates in the United States